The Sa Thầy River is a river of Vietnam. It flows through Kon Tum Province .

References

Rivers of Kon Tum province